Ischioderes is a genus of longhorn beetles of the subfamily Lamiinae, containing the following species:

 Ischioderes bahiensis Monné & Fragoso, 1984
 Ischioderes oncideroides Dillon & Dillon, 1945

References

Onciderini